Arthur Wright (1933-2016) was an English speedway rider.

Speedway career 
Wright was a leading speedway rider in the 1950s. He reached the final of the Speedway World Championship in the 1955 Individual Speedway World Championship.

He rode in the top tier of British Speedway, riding for Bradford Tudors.

World final appearances

Individual World Championship
 1955 -  London, Wembley Stadium - 10th - 6pts

Family
His brother-in-law Arthur Forrest was also a speedway rider who reached five World finals.

References 

1933 births
2016 deaths
British speedway riders
Bradford Dukes riders
Halifax Dukes riders
Oxford Cheetahs riders
Belle Vue Aces riders